Weiyuan General Cannon, also known as "Weiyuan General Gun" or "Divine Invincible Great General Cannon",  was a large-caliber, short-barreled front-mounted mortar, manufactured in the 29th year of Kangxi in the Qing Dynasty (1690). 

Weiyuan General Cannon was first developed by Nan Huairen, but eventually failed, and was later developed successfully by Dai Zi (戴梓),  a firearms maker in the early Qing Dynasty.

Specifications
Weiyuan General Cannon, made of bronze,  had a caliber of 212 mm, a length of 69 cm, and weighed 280 kg.

History
At the beginning of the Qing Dynasty, the Junghar nobles, supported by Tsarist Russia, launched a large-scale rebellion. In order to quell this rebellion, Emperor Xuanye ordered the manufacture of firearms. Nan Huairen accepted the task of making cannons, he spent a year but failed to build it. Then, Dai Zi built the cannon in eight days (another way of saying eight months). Emperor Xuanye was so happy about this that he led all ministers to try it out themselves, and then named the cannon "Weiyuan General Cannon".

Usages
Weiyuan General Cannon played an important role in the Pacification of the Dzungar Rebellion (平定准噶尔叛乱) by the Kangxi Emperor,  and the Qing army's several battles against the enemy.

See also
Hongyipao
Divine Invincible Great General Cannon

References

Individual cannons
Chinese inventions
17th century in China
17th-century weapons
Artillery of China
Military history of the Qing dynasty